Medetera bistriata is a species of longlegged fly in the family Dolichopodidae.

References

Further reading

External links

 

Medeterinae
Insects described in 1929
Taxa named by Octave Parent